The Party for Progress and Concord (PPC) is a political party in Rwanda. The party's motto is: 'Development; Concord; Rwanda's Welfare'.

History
The party was established in 2003 after the banning of the Republican Democratic Movement. In the 2003 parliamentary elections the party received 2% of the vote, failing to win a seat.

Prior to the 2008 parliamentary elections the party joined the Rwandan Patriotic Front-led coalition, and won a single seat in the Chamber of Deputies. It nominated Alvera Mukabaramba as its candidate for the 2010 presidential elections; she finished fourth out of the four candidates with 0.4% of the vote. The party remained part of the coalition for the 2013 elections, in which it retained its seat.

Platform
The ideological focus of the PPC is economic and social development in Rwanda. The party's main commitments, as outlined on their website, are as follows:

 Promote Rwandans’ living conditions mainly based on the Education For All Policy, good health, the promotion of the living conditions of the population and of housing in Rwanda;
 Fight for the establishment of an efficient wage policy;
 Promotion of justice, gender equality and citizenship;
 Sensitisation of Rwandans about work;
 Technology-based development and economy; 
 Facilitation of Rwandan population access to finances by establishing a programme reducing bank guarantee and loan interest rates.

References

External links
Official website

Political parties in Rwanda
Political parties established in 2003
2003 establishments in Rwanda